Shire Haji Farah Yusuf is a Somali entrepreneur. He is the Minister of Planning and International Relations of Puntland.

Biography

Farah hails from the autonomous Puntland region in northeastern Somalia. He belongs to the Cali Saleebaan sub-clan of the Majeerteen Harti Darod.

By profession, Farah is a successful entrepreneur. He is an Executive Committee Member of the Somali Business Council based in the United Arab Emirates.

In 2013, Farah presented himself as a candidate in the 2014 Puntland presidential elections, which took place on 8 January 2014 in Garowe. He was eliminated in the first round of voting, with former Prime Minister of Somalia Abdiweli Mohamed Ali declared the winner.

Minister of Finance

Appointment
On 28 January 2014, Farah was appointed Puntland's Minister of Finance by the region's new President Abdiweli Mohamed Ali. He replaced Farah Ali Jama at the post.

Minister of Planning and International Relations

Appointment
on June 17, 2015 Farah was appointed's Minister of Planning and International Relations by the President Abdiweli Mohamed Ali.

Regional tax reform
In April 2014, Farah's Ministry of Finance announced that the Puntland government would start taxation of UN and international organizations working in Puntland. According to the head of the Nugal tax department Abdiwahab Farah Ali, this is the first such initiative undertaken in the regional state, and is expected to raise available revenue for local development projects by the new Puntland authorities. The decision is part of a pledge by Puntland President Abdiweli Mohamed Ali to increase the government's development funding in part through higher taxation. Toward this end, the Puntland government already increased taxes on commercial firms operating in the state in order to meet regional financing benchmarks.

Military command

In December 2016, Farah led the Puntland Security Force's counter-offensive against the ISS-occupied town of Qandala during the Qandala campaign. His forces succeeded in retaking Qandala on 7 December 2016. Farah then asked refugees to "return to the town, to come; we want to tell them that the town is peaceful, [we] will help them resettle."

See also
Ibrahim Artan Ismail
Hussein Mohamed

References

Living people
Ethnic Somali people
Somalian businesspeople
Somalian Muslims
Year of birth missing (living people)